Paulina Wright Davis ( Kellogg; August 7, 1813 – August 24, 1876) was an American abolitionist, suffragist, and educator. She was one of the founders of the New England Woman Suffrage Association.

Early life
Davis was born in Bloomfield, New York to Captain Ebenezer Kellogg and Polly ( Saxton) Kellogg. The family moved to the frontier near Niagara Falls in 1817. Both her parents died, and she went to live with her aunt in 1820 in Le Roy, New York. She joined the Presbyterian church, although she found it hostile to outspoken women. She wanted to become a missionary, but the church did not allow single women to become missionaries.

Later life
Davis married Francis Wright in 1833, who was a merchant from a prosperous family from Utica, New York. They had similar values and both resigned from their church to protest its pro-slavery stance, and they served on the executive committee of the Central New York Anti-Slavery Society. In 1835, Davis and her husband organized an anti-slavery convention in Utica. They also supported women's rights reforms, associating with Susan B. Anthony, Elizabeth Cady Stanton, and Ernestine Rose. During this period, Davis studied women's health. Francis Wright died in 1845, and the couple had no children.

Davis moved to New York to study medicine following her husband's death. In 1846, she gave lectures on anatomy and physiology to women only. She imported a medical mannequin and toured the eastern United States teaching women and urging them to become physicians. In 1849, she married Thomas Davis, a Democrat from Providence, Rhode Island, and they adopted two daughters.

In 1850, Davis started to focus her energies on women's rights. She stopped lecturing and helped to arrange the first National Women's Rights Convention in Worcester, Massachusetts, at which she presided and delivered the opening address In her speech, she argued that women were not being afforded the constitutional protections of equal protection and due process, and that they were treated as a "disabled caste" by the government. She was president of the National Woman's Rights Central Committee from 1850 to 1858. In 1853, she began editing the women's newspaper The Una, handing over the responsibility to Caroline Healey Dall in 1855.

Davis was one of the founders of the New England Woman Suffrage Association in 1868. When the group splintered, she and Susan B. Anthony became involved in the National Woman Suffrage Association. In 1870, she arranged the twentieth anniversary of the Women's Suffrage Movement meeting and published The History of the National Woman's Rights Movement.

Death and honors
Davis died on August 24, 1876, in Providence, Rhode Island, seventeen days after her 63rd birthday, and was eulogized by Elizabeth Cady Stanton. She was inducted into the National Women’s Hall of Fame in 2002. In 2003, she was inducted into the Rhode Island Heritage Hall of Fame, along with her second husband, Thomas Davis.

See also
 List of suffragists and suffragettes
 Married Women's Property Acts in the United States
 Timeline of women's suffrage
 Women's suffrage organizations

References

Further reading
 Lederman, S. H. Davis, "Paulina Kellogg Wright". American National Biography Online, Feb. 2000.
 Wayne, Tiffany K. Woman Thinking: Feminism and Transcendentalism in Nineteenth-Century America. Lanham, MD: Rowman and Littlefield, 2005.

External links
 
	

1813 births
1876 deaths
Activists from New York (state)
American abolitionists
American editors
American suffragists
American women's rights activists
Educators from New York (state)
19th-century American women educators
People from East Bloomfield, New York
People from Le Roy, New York
People from Providence, Rhode Island
19th-century American educators
Women civil rights activists